Garrett Bradbury (born June 20, 1995) is an American football center for the Minnesota Vikings of the National Football League (NFL). He played college football at NC State and was selected by the Vikings in the first round of the 2019 NFL Draft.

Early years
Bradbury attended Charlotte Christian School in Charlotte, North Carolina, where played high school football as a tight end and defensive lineman.

College career
Bradbury was originally a tight end at NC State before moving to the offensive line in 2015. As a senior in 2018, he was a consensus All-American and won the Rimington Trophy. He did not allow a single quarterback sack in over 900 snaps in 2018.

Professional career

Bradbury was drafted by the Minnesota Vikings in the first round with the 18th overall pick in the 2019 NFL Draft. As a rookie, he started all 16 regular season games and both of the Vikings' playoff games in the 2019 season.  In 2020, Bradbury started all 16 games.

On January 2, 2022, Bradbury was part of a play that re-enacted former Pittsburgh Steelers running back Franco Harris' Immaculate Reception. Quarterback Sean Mannion attempted a pass to tight end Tyler Conklin, who was hit by two Green Bay Packers defenders. The hit on Conklin caused the ball to be deflected into the air, where Bradbury caught it and turned the play into a 21-yard reception.

The Vikings declined the fifth-year option on Bradbury's contract on May 2, 2022, making him a free agent after the season.

On March 14, 2023, Bradbury signed a three-year, $15.7 million contract extension with the Vikings.

References

External links
Minnesota Vikings bio
NC State Wolfpack bio

Living people
Players of American football from Charlotte, North Carolina
American football centers
NC State Wolfpack football players
Minnesota Vikings players
1995 births
All-American college football players